Plocosperma is the sole genus in the Plocospermataceae, a family of flowering plants. The genus contains a single species, Plocosperma buxifolium.

References

Monotypic Lamiales genera
Lamiales